The Arab Games, also called the Pan Arab Games, are a regional multi-sport event held between nations from the Arab world. They are organized by the Union of Arab National Olympic Committees. The first Games took place in 1953 in Alexandria, Egypt. Intended to be held every four years since, political turmoil as well as financial difficulties have made the event an unstable one. Women first competed in 1985.

History 
The Arab Games were the brainchild of Abdul Rahman Hassan Azzam, the first General Secretary of the Arab League (1945–1952). In 1947, Azzam submitted a memorandum to the League, advocating a multi-sport tournament which involved the participation of all Arab countries.

According to Azzam, sport serves as the best way to connect the youth of Arab countries and enable them to build the future of the Arab identity. As a common favorite of young individuals, sports tournaments encourage them to reach out across boundaries, bond with fellow Arabs, and eliminate differences among them. In the same vein, Azzam announced that the youth of the larger Arab nation is eager to gather all the dispersed Arab sports in an annual tournament which will be held in one of the Arab cities.

However, the Arab Games tournament did not gain official approval until 1953, when Ahmed El Demerdash Touny, an Egyptian national and a member of the International Olympic Committee (IOC), managed to convince the concerned parties within the Arab League that an Arab Games tournament would be instrumental to the overall success of the Arab identity. In response to Touny's proposal, the Arab League agreed on establishing the Arab Games, making Egypt the first country to organise an Arab Games tournament, which was held in the city of Alexandria from 26 July,  – 10 August 1953. Eight Arab nations and Indonesia competed in the first Arab Games tournament.

The 2011 Games started in Doha on 9 December with the Emir Hamad bin Khalifa Al Thani inaugurating the event at the Khalifa International Stadium.

Complications 
Typically the games are to take place every four years; however, the last Arab Games were held in 2011 and because of the recent events in the Middle East the games have been postponed with no set date in sight. Initially Lebanon was set to host the 2015 XIII Pan Arab Games, but "withdrew because of the crisis in the Middle East". Following Beirut's withdrawal Morocco was then chosen to host the games, but faced financial complications and also withdrew. "Mohamed Ouzzine, Morocco's Minister of Youth and Sports [at the time, wrote to] the Union of Arab National Olympic Committees (UANOC) telling them that they would be withdrawing."

The same year, Egypt volunteered to host the event. "Sheikh Khalid Al Zubair, chairman of the Oman Olympic Committee (OOC)" said, "We will be offering our full support to Egypt and we have also taken a decision to suspend the financial regulations and other requirements due to lack of time." Had the UANOC accepted Egypt's proposition the games would have taken place in December 2015; however, no such event was held and there have been no formal statements made in regards to the possibility of future games.

Because of the current events in the Middle East there is no telling when the next Arab Games will take place or what country may host the games. If the UANOC keeps the same schedule for holding the games every four years the next games would have taken place in 2019 with an entirely new host country and no reference to the mishap of the 2015 Arab Games.

Editions

 * United Arab Republic with Egypt and Syria.
 ** United Arab Republic with Egypt only.

Sports
37 sports were presented in the Pan Arab Games history.

All-time medal table
Below is the medal table of the Arab Games tournaments, up until the 12th tournament 2011.

 * The United Arab Republic (1958–1971) contains 2 countries Egypt & Syria.

See also
African Games
Asian Games
GCC Games

References

Sources
Bell, Daniel (2003). Encyclopedia of International Games. McFarland and Company, Inc. Publishers, Jefferson, North Carolina. .

External links

Athletics medalists
Arab Games 2007 website
Arab Games 2011 official website
Arab Games 2011 Exhibition and Timeline

 
Multi-sport events
Sport in the Arab world
Arab League
Recurring sporting events established in 1953